= Mohamed Al-Muntasir =

Libyan businessman (born 1960)

Mohamed Al-Muntasir (Arabic: محمد المنتصر born 1960) is a Libyan businessman who represented the city of Misrata on the National Transitional Council.
